Ekow Daniels (born May 9, 1929) is a Ghanaian politician, lawyer, and former Interior Minister of Ghana. He was a member of the 2nd Parliament of the 1st Republic of Ghana on the ticket of the CPP.

Early life and education 
Daniels was born on May 9, 1929. He hails from Denkyimanfu, in the central region of Ghana. Daniels holds a Master's and a Doctor of Philosophy, which he attained from the University of London.

Career 
Prior to entering politics, Daniels was a legal practitioner. He was later elected as a member of parliament for Denkyimanfu during the 1965 Ghanaian Parliamentary Elections. Daniels was also appointed as Minister of the Interior and served from August 1979 to September 1981.

References 

1929 births
Ghanaian politicians
Convention People's Party (Ghana) politicians
Alumni of the University of London
Cabinet Ministers of Ghana